KDLK-FM (94.1 FM) is a radio station licensed to Del Rio, Texas, United States. The station serves the Del Rio area. The station is owned by Suday Investment Group Inc.

History
On February 5, 1965, Queen City Broadcasting Company applied to build a new FM radio station in Del Rio at 94.3 MHz. The Federal Communications Commission approved the application on November 22, 1965, and KDLK-FM signed on August 15, 1966, a separately programmed outlet from KDLK (1230 AM). KDLK-AM-FM was sold in 1968 to Western Plains Broadcasting Corporation, headed by Gerald R. Mazur, for $185,000. Rodney Robertson acquired Western Plains in 1972; he moved the KDLK stations into a new house and outfitted the FM with stereo capability for the first time. KDLK-FM programmed a country music format, complementing the Top 40 sound of the AM frequency.

Forum Broadcasting acquired KDLK-AM-FM in 1976 for $165,000. The call letters for the FM station were changed to KLKE on June 4, 1979; the two stations exchanged call letters in 1986, making 94.3 FM KDLK-FM again. KDLK-FM moved to 94.1 MHz in 2002.

After more than 40 years of ownership, Forum sold its Del Rio stations in 2018 to Suday Investment Group, led by Jorge Suday, for $440,000. The sale was consummated on April 4, 2019.

References

External links
 

DLK-FM